The insect family Macromiidae contains the dragonfly species known as cruisers or skimmers. They tend to fly over bodies of water (and roads) straight down the middle. They are similar to Aeshnidae in size, but the eyes are green and just barely meet at the top of the head.

Macromiidae, or Macromiinae, has been traditionally considered as a subfamily of Corduliidae. It contains four genera and 125 species worldwide.

Females of this family lack an ovipositor at the end of the abdomen and lay their eggs by dipping the abdomen in the water as they fly over. Ovipositing is usually done without a male.

Early Stages 
The Naiads hatch after two weeks and are born with three gills for respiration (Lung 2001). 

Naiads are found in rivers, streams, and lakes where there is water movement. They crawl in debris at the water's bottom and wait for prey. They mostly eat mosquito larvae, freshwater shrimp, fish and tadpoles (Young 1955).

References
2. Young, Frank N.; Westfall, Minter J. (1955). "Review of A Manual of the Dragonflies of North America (Anisoptera). (Including the Greater Antilles and the Provinces of the Mexican Border.), Minter J. Westfall, Jr". Quarterly Journal of the Florida Academy of Sciences. 18 (2): 125–127. ISSN 0015-3850.

External links

Images of Macromiidae

 
Libelluloidea
Odonata of Australia
Odonata families
Taxa named by James George Needham